Jarqavieh Olya District (Upper Jarquyeh District) is a district (bakhsh) in Isfahan County, Isfahan Province, Iran. At the 2006 census, its population was 14,099, in 4,053 families. at the 2018 census, its population is over 15,000, in 4121. It is said to have a gold mine in this area.  The District has one city: Hasanabad. The District has two rural districts (dehestan): Jarqavieh Olya Rural District and Ramsheh Rural District.

References 

Isfahan County
Districts of Isfahan Province